Alphabet Soup Children's Entertainment (commonly referred to as Alphabet Soup or simply Soup) was a Canadian trio of children's entertainers based in Winnipeg, Manitoba.

History
Alphabet Soup was formed in 2000. They performed at festivals the Manitoba Children's Museum at local events, and on CBC Radio 3. In 2008 the trio released their first album, You're It!, which was nominated for a WCMA award.

Despite the venture into studio recording, as a children's band Alphabet Soup is principally a live act. Their shows include audience participation; the creation of the "Winnipeg Philharmonica" by handing out harmonicas to audience members is a common feature. Such antics, along with clear positive feedback from the attending children, led to favourable reviews in local media and the group performed at a number of festivals. In addition to their musical work, Alphabet Soup support local charities such as food banks.

References 

Musical groups established in 2000
Canadian children's musical groups
Musical groups from Winnipeg
2000 establishments in Manitoba
Canadian comedy musical groups